Cyperus soyauxii is a species of sedge that is native to West Africa.

The species was first formally described by the botanist Johann Otto Boeckeler in 1884.

See also 
 List of Cyperus species

References 

soyauxii
Taxa named by Johann Otto Boeckeler
Plants described in 1884
Flora of Benin
Flora of Ethiopia
Flora of Gabon
Flora of Ghana
Flora of Togo
Flora of Senegal
Flora of Ivory Coast
Flora of Kenya
Flora of Nigeria